Elie Christopher Bouka (born August 15, 1992) is a Canadian football defensive back for the Calgary Stampeders of the Canadian Football League (CFL). He played CIS football for the Calgary Dinos.

Professional career

Arizona Cardinals
Bouka was signed by the Arizona Cardinals as an undrafted free agent on May 2, 2016. He was placed on injured reserve on August 30, 2016 after suffering a hamstring injury in the preseason.

On August 1, 2017, Bouka was waived by the Cardinals with an injury settlement after suffering an ankle injury.

Saskatchewan Roughriders
Bouka was drafted in the third round of the 2016 CFL Draft by the Saskatchewan Roughriders. After his release from the Cardinals, he signed with the Roughriders on September 20, 2017. He played in four games for the Roughriders in 2017.

Philadelphia Eagles
On January 3, 2018, Bouka signed a reserve/future contract with the Philadelphia Eagles. He was waived/injured by the Eagles on April 30, 2018 and was placed on injured reserve.

On February 21, 2019, Bouka was waived by the Eagles.

Saskatchewan Roughriders
Bouka was placed on the Saskatchewan Roughriders' suspended list on July 3, 2021.

Calgary Stampeders
Bouka was signed by the Calgary Stampeders on February 10, 2022.

References

External links
Calgary Stampeders bio
Calgary Dinos bio
NFL.com

1992 births
Living people
Players of Canadian football from Quebec
Sportspeople from Laval, Quebec
Black Canadian players of American football
Canadian football defensive backs
American football defensive backs
Canadian people of Senegalese descent
Calgary Dinos football players
Arizona Cardinals players
Saskatchewan Roughriders players
Philadelphia Eagles players
Calgary Stampeders players